The 2004 Bad Blood was the third and final Bad Blood professional wrestling pay-per-view (PPV) event produced by World Wrestling Entertainment (WWE). It was held exclusively for wrestlers from the promotion's Raw brand division. The event took place on June 13, 2004, at the Nationwide Arena in Columbus, Ohio. Bad Blood was doubly replaced by One Night Stand and Vengeance in 2005.

The main event was a Hell in a Cell match, in which Triple H defeated Shawn Michaels in a ring surrounded by a steel structure. Two bouts were featured on the undercard. In respective singles matches, World Heavyweight Champion Chris Benoit defeated Kane to retain his title and WWE Intercontinental Champion Randy Orton defeated Shelton Benjamin to retain his title.

The event marked the third time the Hell in a Cell format was used by WWE in a Bad Blood event; the first was at Badd Blood: In Your House in 1997 and the second was at the previous year's event. Bad Blood grossed over $494,000 ticket sales from an attendance of 9,000 and received 264,000 pay-per-view buys, and was instrumental in helping WWE increase its pay-per-view revenue by $4.7 million compared to the previous year. When the event was released on DVD, it peaked at number 3 on Billboard's DVD Sales Chart.

Production

Background
Bad Blood was first held as the 18th In Your House pay-per-view (PPV) in October 1997; In Your House was a series of monthly PPV shows first produced by the then-World Wrestling Federation (WWF, now WWE) in May 1995. The In Your House branding was retired following February 1999's St. Valentine's Day Massacre: In Your House event, as the company moved to install permanent names for each of its monthly PPVs. After six years and after the promotion had been renamed to World Wrestling Entertainment (WWE) in early 2002, WWE announced the return of Bad Blood as its own PPV event to be held in June 2003 and it was made exclusive to wrestlers of the Raw brand, a storyline subdivision called the brand extension in which the promotion divided its roster into two separate brands, Raw and SmackDown!, where wrestlers were exclusively assigned to perform. The 2004 event, which was the third Bad Blood and also Raw-exclusive, took place on June 13 at the Nationwide Arena in Columbus, Ohio.

Storylines
Seven professional wrestling matches were scheduled on the event's card beforehand, which were planned with predetermined outcomes by WWE's script writers. The buildup to these matches and scenarios that took place before, during and after the event were also planned by the script writers. The event featured wrestlers and other talent from Raw's brand – a storyline expansion in which WWE assigned its employees. Wrestlers portrayed either a villainous or fan favorite gimmick, as they followed a series of events which generally built tension, leading to a wrestling match.

The main event scripted into Bad Blood was fought in a Hell in a Cell match between Triple H and Shawn Michaels. The buildup to the match began after Backlash where the main event was a rematch of the main event of WrestleMania XX where Michaels and Triple H took on Chris Benoit in a Triple Threat Match for the World Heavyweight Championship, which saw Benoit retain by forcing Michaels to submit. On the May 3 episode of Raw, Raw General Manager Eric Bischoff booked a match between Benoit and Michaels for the World Heavyweight Championship. The match saw Benoit successfully retain the title after interference by Triple H. On the May 10 episode of Raw, a singles match between Triple H and Shelton Benjamin resulted in a no contest after Michaels attacked Triple H; this resulted in a storyline suspension of Michaels from WWE by Bischoff. On the May 17 episode of Raw, a number one contender's battle royal was contested, with the winner facing Benoit for the World Heavyweight Championship at Bad Blood. During the match, Michaels interfered and eliminated Triple H. On the May 24 episode of Raw, Bischoff scheduled Michaels and Triple H in a Hell in a Cell match at Bad Blood.

One of the featured matches was contested for the World Heavyweight Championship pitting Chris Benoit against Kane, who won the aforementioned battle royal on the May 17 episode of Raw. On the May 24 episode of Raw, Kane cut a promo, in which he revealed that he envied Benoit for having the World Heavyweight Championship and concluded that he would win the championship. On the May 31 episode of Raw, Kane was scheduled in a match against Eugene. The match ended in a disqualification, after Kane hit Eugene with a folding chair. After the match ended, Kane chokeslammed Eugene and began to assault him. Benoit, however, came down to the ring to Eugene's aid. On the June 7 episode of Raw, Benoit and Edge faced off against La Résistance (Sylvain Grenier and Robért Conway) and Kane in a handicap tag team match. The match saw Kane perform a chokeslam and pin Benoit for the win.

The other featured preliminary match was Randy Orton versus Shelton Benjamin in a singles match for Orton's Intercontinental Championship. On the May 17 episode of Raw, Randy Orton was giving a speech. Shelton Benjamin interrupted Orton's speech and challenged Orton to an Intercontinental Championship match. The challenge, however, was denied by Orton, in which prompted Benjamin to attack Orton. On the May 24 episode of Raw, an all-out brawl ensued between Orton and Chris Jericho. The brawl brought out fellow Evolution member, Batista, to Orton's aid. Benjamin also made his way to the ring and evened the sides. As a result of the brawl, Bischoff announced a tag team match, in which Benjamin and Jericho defeated Orton and Batista. On the May 31 episode of Raw, it was announced that Orton would defend the Intercontinental Championship against Benjamin at Bad Blood.

Event

Before the event went live on pay-per-view, Batista defeated Maven in a match taped for Heat, one of WWE's secondary television programs.

Preliminary matches

After Heat, the pay-per-view began with a tag team match for the World Tag Team Championship, where La Résistance (Sylvain Grenier and Robért Conway) defended the titles against Chris Benoit and Edge. La Résistance gained the early advantage when Conway grabbed Edge and rammed him onto the security wall, back first. At one point, Benoit applied a crossface submission hold on Grenier. Kane's pyrotechnics went off and made his way to the ring, as he entered the ring and delivered a Big Boot to Benoit, prompting the referee to end the match in a disqualification, thus La Résistance retained the World Tag Team titles.

The second match was Tyson Tomko, accompanied by Trish Stratus, versus Chris Jericho. In the early stages both competitors wrestled inconclusively, reversed each other's attacks, before Tyson backed Jericho into the ring corner and hit him numerous times with his elbows. Afterwards, Jericho attempted to perform the Lionsault, but Tomko rolled out of the way. The match concluded as Jericho performed an enzuigiri on Tomko for the win.

The next match was for the WWE Intercontinental Championship, in which Randy Orton defended the championship against Shelton Benjamin. The match began with Benjamin performing a drop kick on Orton, which knocked him out to the outside of the ring. Benjamin proceeded to knock Orton over the security barricade into the crowd. Orton got the advantage, after Ric Flair made his way to the ring, distracting Benjamin in the process. The match came to an end when Benjamin went off the top rope and dove onto Orton, but Orton rolled through and hooked Benjamin's tights to pin Benjamin for the three count and retaining the Intercontinental Championship.

The match that followed was a Fatal 4-Way Match for the WWE Women's Championship, with Victoria defending the title against Trish Stratus, Lita, and Gail Kim. The start of the match saw Victoria and Lita double team Stratus, however, Stratus avoided the assault, as she rolled out of the ring. Lita and Victoria went on to double team Kim, however, Stratus pulled Lita out of the ring, afterward Victoria performed a moonsault and landed on Kim's torso. Lita then hit Kim with a DDT. Stratus then went on to use a roll up on Lita to gain a pinfall victory, becoming Women's champion for a fifth time.

The fifth match was between Eugene and Jonathan Coachman. The match started with Eugene hitting an arm drag on Coachman and hitting numerous headbutts. An unknown woman in a bikini came out to the ringside area with some cookies, Coachman offered cookies to Eugene. The woman lured Eugene out of the ring and Eugene went over and grabbed some cookies. As Eugene went to grab more cookies, Coachman slammed Eugene's head into the cookie tray. A spot in the match saw Garrison Cade come out to ringside with a stuffed animal, which prompted Cade to tear up said toy animal. Cade tried to hold Eugene so Coachman could get the advantage, however, Eugene was able to dodge the attack, as Coachman ended up hitting Cade instead. Eugene hit a Rock bottom and a People's Elbow then pinned Coachman for the win.

Main event matches

The featured preliminary match was for the World Heavyweight Championship in which Chris Benoit defended the championship against Kane. Benoit started the match by delivering chops to Kane. Mid-way in the match, Benoit charged towards Kane, but Kane delivered a sidewalk slam and tossed him over the top rope to the arena floor. Kane then stepped out of the ring and grabbed Benoit to launch him into the ring post, but Benoit was able to reverse Kane's attack, and slammed him into the ring post. After blocking a Crippler crossface attempt, Kane chokeslammed Benoit for a near-fall. The match concluded when Kane attempted a flying clothesline but Benoit countered it with the Crippler crossface, which Kane fought out of. Benoit rolled Kane up in a pin to retain the World Heavyweight Championship.

The main event was the Hell in a Cell match between Shawn Michaels and Triple H. The match began with Michaels delivering a Thesz Press and slamming Triple H into the cell wall, resulting in Triple H bleeding. Triple H got the advantage, as he was able to counter a piledriver and performed a back body drop on Michaels. Another attack saw Triple H hit Michaels with the steel steps, which resulted in Michaels bleeding. A spot in the match saw Michaels lay Triple H on a table, as he climbed onto a ladder that he took out from under the ring, and performed a diving elbow drop onto Triple H through the table. Triple H performed a Pedigree on Michaels for a near-fall. Michaels performed Sweet Chin Music on Triple H for a near-fall. Triple H performed two Pedigrees on Michaels for the win. After the match, Michaels was given a standing ovation by the audience.

Reception
The Nationwide Arena usually can accommodate 19,500, but the capacity was reduced for the event. This event grossed over $494,000 from an approximate attendance of 9,000. It also received 264,000 pay-per-view buys. Bad Blood helped WWE earn $21.6 million in revenue from pay-per-view events versus $16.9 million the previous year, which was later confirmed by Linda McMahon, the CEO of WWE, on September 7, 2005, in a quarterly result. Canadian Online Explorer's professional wrestling section rated the event a five out of 10 stars. The rating was higher than the Bad Blood event in 2003, which rated a four out of 10 stars. The World Heavyweight Championship match between Chris Benoit and Kane was rated an eight out of 10 stars. Additionally, the match between Eugene and Jonathan Coachman was rated zero out of 10 stars. John Canton of TJR Wrestling gave the Hell in a Cell match a 4 star out of 5, naming it the match of the night, praising Shawn Michaels and Triple H for their performance but stated the match was too long. He gave the entire event a score of 6 out of 10.

The event was released on DVD on July 13, 2004. The DVD was distributed by the label, Sony Music Entertainment. The DVD reached third on Billboard's DVD Sales Chart for recreational sports during the week of August 28, 2004, although falling thereafter. It remained in the chart for two consecutive weeks, until the week of September 25, 2004, when it ranked 19th.

Aftermath
Following Bad Blood, Raw commentator Jim Ross tried making amends between Shawn Michaels and Triple H by making them shake hands. As Michaels and Triple H extended their hands to shake, however, Kane came out and attacked Michaels, with Kane, in storyline, crushing Michaels' throat with a wedged chair. Michaels was then taken out in an ambulance for medical attention. Lita's pregnancy was scripted into a storyline. On the June 21 episode of Raw, it appeared that Lita's then-boyfriend, Matt Hardy was going to propose to Lita, having found out she was pregnant, but he was interrupted by Kane, who claimed to be the father of Lita's child. Two months later, it was revealed that Kane was, indeed, the father. At SummerSlam, the rivalry between Kane and Hardy intensified, when they were booked in a "Till Death Do Us Part" match, with the stipulation that Lita would be obliged to marry Kane should Hardy lose. Kane won the match, leading to he and a reluctant Lita marrying one another on an episode of Raw. On the August 30 episode of Raw, Kane revealed that Eric Bischoff's wedding gift to them was to name any match he wanted for at the September annual event, Unforgiven. Continuing with the scripted angle, Lita informed Kane that his opponent at the event was Shawn Michaels. At Unforgiven, Michaels defeated Kane in a no disqualification match.

On the June 21 episode of Raw, a number one contender's match between Eugene and Triple H was scheduled in which the winner would face Chris Benoit for the World Heavyweight Championship. The match, however, ended in a No Contest. On the June 28 episode of Raw, a rematch for the World Heavyweight Championship between Benoit and Kane took place. A stipulation was placed that Benoit had to win the match by submission, while Kane could win by pinfall, submission, disqualification or countout. Benoit won the match, after he made Kane submit to a crossface. At Vengeance, Benoit defeated Triple H to retain his Championship.

A heated confrontation between Randy Orton and Edge was seen, with Edge spearing Orton. The following week, it was announced that Orton would defend the Intercontinental Championship against Edge at Vengeance. Weeks leading to the event, both men took the upper hand over one another. At the scheduled event, Orton lost the Intercontinental Championship to Edge.

The 2004 Bad Blood would be the final Bad Blood event, as it was doubly replaced by One Night Stand and Vengeance the following year. After 13 years, WWE announced that Bad Blood would be revived and held on July 9, 2017; however, these plans were scrapped in favor of an event titled Great Balls of Fire.

Results

Notes

References
(2004). Bad Blood [DVD]. World Wrestling Entertainment.

External links
 Bad Blood 2004 results

2004 in Ohio
Events in Columbus, Ohio
2004
Professional wrestling in Columbus, Ohio
2004 WWE pay-per-view events
June 2004 events in the United States
WWE Raw